Eucalyptus luculenta is a species of mallee that is endemic to a small area on the south coast of Western Australia. It has smooth bark, lance-shaped to egg-shaped leaves, flower buds in groups of seven, pale yellow to white flowers and cup-shaped, barrel-shaped or cylindrical fruit.

Description
It has smooth greyish to pink powdery bark on the trunk and branches. Flowering has been observed in October and November and the flowers are pale yellow to white. The fruit is a woody, cup-shaped, barrel-shaped or cylindrical capsule with the valves protruding above the level of the rim. The fruit have a waxy coating but are markedly glossy underneath.

Taxonomy and naming
Eucalyptus luculenta was first formally described in 1999 by Lawrie Johnson and Ken Hill from a specimen collected by Johnson in 1983 between the Balladonia Roadhouse and Mount Ragged. The description was published in the journal Telopea. The specific epithet (luculenta) is a Latin word meaning "full of light" or "bright", referring to the glossiness of the fruit underneath a waxy coating.

Distribution and habitat
This eucalypt is confined to the Mount Ragged area where it grows in sandy calcareous soils.

Conservation status
This eucalypt is classified as "Priority Two" by the Western Australian Government Department of Parks and Wildlife. meaning that it is poorly known and from only one or a few locations.

See also
List of Eucalyptus species

References

Eucalypts of Western Australia
luculenta
Myrtales of Australia
Mallees (habit)
Plants described in 1999
Taxa named by Lawrence Alexander Sidney Johnson
Taxa named by Ken Hill (botanist)